Iliya Dyakov (Bulgarian: Илия Дяков; born 29 September 1963) is a Bulgarian former footballer who played as a defender. He was selected for the Bulgaria squad at the 1986 FIFA World Cup but did not play. He did play in the qualifying campaigns for the 1986 tournament, winning 5 caps. In club football, he spent his whole career in his native country, where he represented his hometown club Dobrudzha Drobich, CSKA Sofia, and Slavia Sofia.

References

External links

1963 births
Living people
People from Dobrich
Bulgarian footballers
Bulgaria international footballers
PFC Dobrudzha Dobrich players
PFC CSKA Sofia players
PFC Slavia Sofia players
First Professional Football League (Bulgaria) players
Association football central defenders
1986 FIFA World Cup players